Anybody's War is a 1930 American pre-Code comedy film directed by Richard Wallace and written by Lloyd Corrigan, Hector Turnbull and Walter Weems. The film stars George Moran, Charles Mack, Joan Peers, Neil Hamilton, Walter Weems and Betty Farrington. The film was released on July 10, 1930, by Paramount Pictures.

Cast 
George Moran as Willie
Charles Mack as Amos Crow
Joan Peers as Mary Jane Robinson
Neil Hamilton as Red Reinhardt
Walter Weems as Sergeant Skipp
Betty Farrington as Camilla
Walter McGrail as Captain Davis

References

External links 
 

1930 films
1930s English-language films
American comedy films
1930 comedy films
Paramount Pictures films
Films directed by Richard Wallace
Military humor in film
Western Front (World War I) films
American black-and-white films
1930s American films